Mirror armour (meaning "mirror"; , , meaning "protect-heart mirror"), sometimes referred to as disc armour or as  or  ( meaning "four mirrors"; whence), was a type of cuirass used mainly in Asia, the Middle East, and Eastern Europe; including India, Persia, Tibet, Russia, and the Ottoman Empire. It literally translates to "four mirrors" which is a reflection of how these pieces looked, which resembles four (sometimes more) metal discs or rectangular armour plates. Mirror armor was used in some cultures up to the 20th century.

Description and history
"Mirror armour" is a type of partial plate armour which was developed initially from round metal mirrors (a kind of rondel) worn over other armour (usually over mail) as enforcement. Metal mirrors in this armour were considered as protection from not only cold steel and arrows, but also supernatural influence. It was believed that mirrors could reflect the evil eye, so they were polished and worn over other armour.

Early mirror armour consisted of a round mirror attached to the body with a few leather laces (similar to the Roman phaelerae). The Kardiophylax was used by the Samnites before they developed the triple-disc cuirass. Although, it continued to be used as a Status symbol after it was discontinued from popular use. This armor would go on to be used by Salian priests as a form of ritual dress.

Late mirror armour took the form of a mirror cuirass, helmet, greaves, and bracers worn with mail. There were two alternative constructions of mirror cuirass:
 with discs – two large round mirrors surrounded by smaller mirror plates,  such as the Klivanion.
 without discs – typically having four mirror plates – frontplate, backplate, and two sideplates joined by hinges or laces.

Early types of this armour were known among the Celtiberians, by the Romans, in the Middle East, Central Asia, India, Russia, Siberia (where it was worn by Siberian natives before the Russian conquest), Mongolia, Indochina and China (including Tibet too).

Later types of this armour were known in the Middle East, Central Asia, India, and Russia. The mirror cuirass with discs was popular in Turkey and Russia, while that without discs was popular in Persia, Central Asia and India.

In India, there was a popular form of brigandine with a few mirror plates riveted to it.

According to Bobrov, round metal mirrors worn by Mongolian warriors as armour reinforcement are shown in Persian miniatures of 13c. This is verified by archaeological finds in Central Asia and the Far East. This kind of armour prevailed in Central Asia during 15–17c, and could be worn over any armour including brigandines, lamellar armour, chainmail and even plated mail. In 16c in Persia, mirror plates became much larger and changed their shape to rectangular in order to improve body protection. This improved mirror armour gradually spread during 16–17c to Central Asia and North India. Further improvements were made during the 1640s when mirror plates evolved into mirror cuirass, which sometimes had additional mirror plates used as pauldrons for protection of the shoulder laces. Besides separate mirror plates laced as reinforcement to other armours there were small mirrors that were sewn or riveted to brigandine. Brigandines with such integral reinforcements were very popular at the end of the 15th century, but their use had practically been abandoned by the end of the 17th century.

Many modern army ballistic vests resemble the "Chahar-Aine" layout with basic soft anti-fragmentation armour (analogue of chain mail) covering a large area, and two, four or even more bulletproof plates ("mirrors") worn above it, thus combining weight saving and freedom of movement with high level of protection of vital areas.

Gallery
Mirror armours:

Brigandines reinforced by mirror plates:

Compare analogues which are not mirror armours, but have the same construction:

See also
Mail and plate armour
Mail (armour)

References

External links

 The Silk Road Designs Armoury (same site at the internet archive)
 The Silk Road Designs Armoury : Mirrors and Brassier Plates
 The Silk Road Designs Armoury : Chahar-Ai-Ne
 The Silk Road Designs Armoury : Disc Armour
 Russian medieval arms and armour
 Simple Mirror Armour (Tibetan)
 Transitional (from round to rectangular) Mirror Armour (Persian)
 Indian Brigandine with Mirror Plates

Asian armour
Mirrors